The Gazi Race is a Turkish  thoroughbred horse flat race that is established in honor of the founder of the Turkish Republic Gazi Mustafa Kemal. It is country's most prestigious horse racing event, which is held uninterruptedly since its establishment in 1927.

History
Mustafa Kemal, founder of the Turkish Republic, was honored with the title Ghazi in 1923 by the Turkish Grand National Assembly due to his successful command at the Turkish War of Independence. He used this title until 1934, when he was given the surname "Atatürk" (literally: Father of Turks) following the adoption of the Surname Law.

A fan of horse racing, Gazi Mustafa Kemal said "Horse racing is the social need for modern societies". He organized horse races even during the years of the War of Independence in Ankara, in the new capital of modern Turkey.

The money award was TL 2,000. The winner was jockey İhsan Atçı with racehorse "Neriman" owned by Ali Muhiddin Hacı Bekir, member of a renowned candy producing dynasty.

In 1928, the event was run as an open race restricted to age and weight. Succeeding Turkish presidents, Celal Bayar in 1929 with "Cap Gris Nez" and İsmet İnönü in 1930 with "Olgo", were also among the winners of the Gazi Race.

The prize was set to TL 5,000. In 1936, Gazi Race was held in the Ankara City Race Course (Ankara Şehir Hipodromu) constructed next to the Ankara 19 Mayıs Stadium.

Whenever Atatürk was in Ankara, he enjoyed to observe horse racing. In 1938, the race was renamed "Atatürk Race". Since its inauguration, the event is held every year without interruption. Gazi Race was transferred in 1968 from Ankara to Istanbul's Veliefendi Race Course.

Award
The winner of the race receives a purse in amount of TL 850,000 (approx. US$530,000 as of June 2011). In addition, a bonus payment totaling to about TL 533,500 (approx. US$333,000 as of June 2011) is given for breeding and enrollment expenses. Since 1970, a solid silver trophy in form of an equestrian statue depicting Gazi Mustafa Kemal is bestowed by the Turkish president. It was created by sculptor Mehmet Şadi Çalık (1917-1979).

Records
Record holder of the Gazi Race is the thoroughbred horse "Bold Pilot" owned by Özdemir Atman that was run by jockey Halis Karataş (born 1972) at a time of 2.26.22 in 1996.

Racehorse owner and breeder Sadık Eliyeşil (1925-2008) is the most winner of the Gazi Race with 13 titles:

Mümin Çılgın (born 1935) is the most successful jockey of the Gazi Race with nine wins:

In 2012, Halis Karataş won the Gazi Race for the 5th time with the thoroughbred horse "Matador Yaşar" owned by Ahmet Göçmen. His former victories were in 1996, 2005, 2006 and 2011.

References

Horse races in Turkey
Flat horse races for three-year-olds
Recurring sporting events established in 1927
Sports competitions in Ankara
Sports competitions in Istanbul
Things named after Mustafa Kemal Atatürk
Annual events in Turkey
1927 establishments in Turkey